Samantapāsādikā refers to a collection of Pali commentaries on the Theravada Tipitaka Vinaya. It was a translation of Sinhala commentaries into Pali by Buddhaghosa in the 5th century. Many of the verses used in Samantapāsādikā are from older the Dípavamsa (est. 3rd - 4th Century CE).
Samantapasadika is made of two words, samanta and pasadika. Here 'samanta' indicates 'all' or 'entire', and 'pāsādika' means 'lovely' or 'pleasing'.

References

5th-century books
Aṭṭhakathā